The Adventures of André & Wally B. (or simply André & Wally B.) is a 1984 American CGI-animated short film that was groundbreaking by the standards of the time and helped spark the film industry's interest in computer animation. The film was produced by the Lucasfilm Computer Graphics Project, a division of Lucasfilm and the predecessor of Pixar.

The animation in the film was by John Lasseter and was his first computer animated project with Lucasfilm. Partially as a result of the success of this project, and others that followed, Lasseter became an executive at Pixar. The film was released on July 25, 1984, at SIGGRAPH in Minneapolis.

Plot
The short involves a boy named André awakening in a forest and being confronted by a pesky bumblebee named Wally B. André tricks the bee into turning his back so that he can run away. Angered, Wally B. chases André and eventually catches up with him, and strikes with the stinger. A collision occurs off-screen and a dizzy Wally B. reappears with a bent stinger. Shortly thereafter, Wally B. gets hit by André's tossed hat as a last laugh for revenge.

Production
The credits for the piece are: concept/direction Alvy Ray Smith, animation John Lasseter, technical lead Bill Reeves, technical contributions by Tom Duff (who designed the animation program called "md", short for "motion doctor"), Eben Ostby, Rob Cook, Loren Carpenter, Ed Catmull, David Salesin, Tom Porter, and Sam Leffler, filming by David DiFrancesco, Tom Noggle, and Don Conway, and computer logistics by Craig Good.

The title is a tribute to the 1981 film My Dinner with Andre, starring André Gregory and Wallace Shawn, the latter of which went on to voice Rex for the Toy Story franchise. It was originally entitled My Breakfast with André, about waking up with an android. The android's awakening was meant to symbolize the rise of computer animation itself.

The animation on the short was groundbreaking, featuring the first use of motion blur in CG animation and complex 3D backgrounds, where the lighting styles and colors were inspired by Maxfield Parrish, made using particle systems. Lasseter pushed the envelope by asking for manipulatable shapes capable of the squash and stretch style, as earlier CG models had generally been restricted to rigid geometric shapes. It was rendered on a Cray X-MP/2 and a Cray X-MP/4 supercomputer at Cray Researchs computer center in Mendota Heights, Minnesota, ten VAX-11/750 superminicomputers at Project Athena at MIT, and one VAX-11/780, and three VAX-11/750 computers at Lucasfilm. These machines were often available only at night, and much of the movie was therefore made "in the wee hours". Cray Research allowed them to use their computer in hopes Lucasfilm would buy a machine. The film's soundtrack was partially produced by SoundDroid.

Release
The film premiered on July 25, 1984, in Minneapolis at the annual SIGGRAPH conference, though 2 shots or about 6 seconds of the film were incomplete and made of wire-frame renders, so-called pencil test footage, over the completed backgrounds. The final rendering of the film was released a month later, on August 17 at Toronto's International Animation Festival. The film was also showcased at "Digicon '85".

Home media
It was released for home video in the collections State of the Art of Computer Animation, Tiny Toy Stories, and Pixar Short Films Collection, Volume 1 (DVD/Blu-ray).

See also

 List of Pixar shorts
 Walt Disney Pictures

References

External links
 
 The Adventures of André and Wally B. at Alvy Ray Smith
 
 
 

1984 comedy films
1984 computer-animated films
1984 short films
1980s American animated films
1980s animated short films
American animated short films
American comedy short films
American computer-animated films
Animated films about insects
Animated films without speech
Films about bees
Films directed by Alvy Ray Smith
Films produced by John Lasseter
Films set in forests
Lucasfilm animated films
Pixar short films